Type III Collagen is a homotrimer, or a protein composed of three identical peptide chains (monomers), each called an alpha 1 chain of type III collagen. Formally, the monomers are called  collagen type III, alpha-1 chain and in humans are encoded by the  gene. Type III collagen is one of the fibrillar collagens whose proteins have a long, inflexible, triple-helical domain.

Protein structure and function 
Type III collagen is synthesized by cells as a pre-procollagen.

The signal peptide is cleaved off producing a procollagen molecule.  Three identical type III procollagen chains come together at the carboxy-terminal ends, and the structure is stabilized by the formation of disulphide bonds. Each individual chain folds into left-handed helix and the three chains are then wrapped together into a right-handed superhelix, the triple helix. Prior to assembling the super-helix, each monomer is subjected to a number of post-translational modifications that occur while the monomer is being translated. First, on the order of 145 prolyl residues of the 239 in the triple-helical domain are hydroxylated to 4-hydroxyproline by prolyl-4-hydroxylase. Second, some of the lysine residues are hydroxylated or glycosylated, and some lysine as well as hydroxylysine residues undergo oxidative deamination catalysed by lysyl oxidase.  Other post-translational modifications occur after the triple helix is formed. The large globular domains from both ends of the molecule are removed by C- and amino(N)-terminal-proteinases to generate triple-helical type III collagen monomers called tropocollagen. In addition, crosslinks form between certain lysine and hydroxylysine residues. In the extracellular space in tissues, type III collagen monomers assemble into macromolecular fibrils, which aggregate into fibers, providing a strong support structure for tissues requiring tensile strength.

The triple-helical conformation, which is a characteristic feature of all fibrillar collagens, is possible because of the presence of a glycine as every third amino acid in the sequence of about 1000 amino acids. When the right-handed super-helix is formed, the glycine residues of each of the monomers is positioned at the center of the super-helix (where the three monomers "touch"). Each left-handed helix is characterized by a complete turn in about 3.3 amino acids. The periodicity induced by the glycines at non-integer spacing results in a super-helix that completes one turn in about 20 amino acids. This (Gly-X-Y)n sequence is repeated 343 times in the type III collagen molecule. Proline or hydroxyproline is often found in the X- and Y-position giving the triple helix stability.

In addition to being an integral structural component of many organs, type III collagen is also an important regulator of the diameter of type I and II collagen fibrils. Type III collagen is also known to facilitate platelet aggregation through its binding to platelets and therefore, play an important role in blood clotting.

Tissue distribution 
Type III collagen is found as a major structural component in hollow organs such as large blood vessels, uterus and bowel. It is also found in many other tissues together with type I collagen.

Gene 
The gene has 51 exons and is approximately 40 kbp long. The COL3A1 gene is in tail-to-tail orientation with a gene for another fibrillar collagen, namely .

Two transcripts are generated from the gene using different polyadenylation sites.
 Although alternatively spliced transcripts have been detected for this gene, they are the result of mutations; these mutations alter RNA splicing, often leading to the exclusion of an exon or use of cryptic splice sites.  The resulting defective protein is the cause of a severe, rare disease, the vascular type of  Ehlers-Danlos syndrome (vEDS). These studies have also provided important information about RNA splicing mechanisms in multi-exon genes.

Clinical significance 

Mutations in the  gene cause Ehlers-Danlos syndrome, vascular type (vEDS; also known as the EDS type IV; OMIM 130050). It is the most severe form of EDS, since patients often die suddenly due to rupture of large arteries or other hollow organs.

A few patients with arterial aneurysms without clear signs of EDS have also been found to have COL3A1 mutations.

More recently, mutations in COL3A1 have also been identified in patients with severe brain anomalies suggesting that type III collagen is important for the normal development of the brain during embryogenesis. This disease is similar to that caused by mutations in GRP56 (OMIM 606854). Type III collagen is a known ligand for the receptor GRP56.

The first single base mutation in the COL3A1 gene was reported in 1989 in a patient with vEDS and changed a glycine amino acid to a serine Since then, over 600 different mutations have been characterized in the COL3A1 gene. About 2/3 of these mutations change a glycine amino acid to another amino acid in the triple-helical region of the protein chain. A large number of RNA splicing mutations have also been identified. Interestingly, most of these mutations lead to exon skipping, and produce a shorter polypeptide, in which the Gly-Xaa-Yaa triplets stay in frame and there are no premature termination codons.

The functional consequences of COL3A1 mutations can be studied in a cell culture system. A small bunch biopsy of skin is obtained from the patient and used to start the culture of skin fibroblasts which express type III collagen. The type III collagen protein synthesized by these cells can be studied for its thermal stability. In other words, the collagens can be subjected to a short digestion by proteinases called trypsin and chymotrypsin at increasing temperatures. Intact type III collagen molecules, which have formed a stable triple helix, can withstand such treatment till about 41oC, whereas molecules with mutations that lead to glycine substitutions fall apart at a much lower temperature.   

It is difficult to predict the clinical severity based on the type and location of COL3A1 mutations. Another important clinical implication is that several studies have reported on mosaicism. This refers to a situation where one of the parents carries the mutation in some, but not all of her or his cells, and appears phenotypically healthy, but has more than one affected offspring. In such a situation the risk for another affected child is higher than in a genotypically normal parent.

Type III collagen could also be important in several other human diseases. Increased amounts of type III collagen are found in many fibrotic conditions such as liver and kidney fibrosis, and systemic sclerosis. This has led to a search for serum biomarkers that could be used for diagnosing these conditions without having to obtain a tissue biopsy. The most widely used biomarker is the N-terminal propeptide of type III procollagen, which is cleaved off during the biosynthesis of type III collagen.

Animal models 
Four different mouse models with  defects have been reported. Inactivation of the murine COL3A1 gene using homologous recombination technique led to a shorter life span in homozygous mutant mice. The mice died prematurely from a rupture of major arteries mimicking the human vEDS phenotype. These mice also had a severe malformation of the brain. Another study discovered mice with a naturally occurring large deletion of the COL3A1 gene. These mice died suddenly due to thoracic aortic dissections. The third type of mutant mice were transgenic mice with a Gly182Ser mutation. These mice developed severe skin wounds, demonstrated vascular fragility in the form of reduced tensile strength and died prematurely at the age of 13–14 weeks. The fourth mouse model with defective COL3A1 gene is the tight skin mouse (Tsk2/+), which resembles the human systemic sclerosis.

See also 
 Collagen
 Ehlers-Danlos syndrome

Notes

References

Further reading

External links
 
 
 
 

Collagens